

Events

Pre-1600
70 – A Roman army under Titus occupies and plunders Jerusalem.
 878 – Louis the Stammerer is crowned as king of West Francia by Pope John VIII.
1159 – Pope Alexander III is chosen.
1191 – Third Crusade: Battle of Arsuf: Richard I of England defeats Saladin at Arsuf.
1228 – Holy Roman Emperor Frederick II lands in Acre, Israel, and starts the Sixth Crusade, which results in a peaceful restoration of the Kingdom of Jerusalem. 
1303 – Guillaume de Nogaret takes Pope Boniface VIII prisoner on behalf of Philip IV of France.
1571 – Thomas Howard, 4th Duke of Norfolk, is arrested for his role in the Ridolfi plot to assassinate Queen Elizabeth I of England and replace her with Mary, Queen of Scots.

1601–1900
1620 – The town of Kokkola is founded by King Gustavus Adolphus of Sweden.
1630 – The city of Boston, Massachusetts, is founded in North America.
1652 – Around 15,000 Han farmers and militia rebel against Dutch rule on Taiwan.
1695 – Henry Every perpetrates one of the most profitable pirate raids in history with the capture of the Grand Mughal ship Ganj-i-Sawai. In response, Emperor Aurangzeb threatens to end all English trading in India.
1706 – War of the Spanish Succession: Siege of Turin ends, leading to the withdrawal of French forces from North Italy.
1764 – Election of Stanisław August Poniatowski as the last ruler of the Polish–Lithuanian Commonwealth.
1776 – According to American colonial reports, Ezra Lee makes the world's first submarine attack in the Turtle, attempting to attach a time bomb to the hull of HMS Eagle in New York Harbor (no British records of this attack exist).
1778 – American Revolutionary War: France invades Dominica in the British West Indies, before Britain is even aware of France's involvement in the war.
1812 – French invasion of Russia: The Battle of Borodino, the bloodiest battle of the Napoleonic Wars, is fought near Moscow and results in a French victory.
1818 – Carl III of Sweden–Norway is crowned king of Norway, in Trondheim.
1822 – Dom Pedro I declares Brazil independent from Portugal on the shores of the Ipiranga Brook in São Paulo.
1856 – The Saimaa Canal is inaugurated.
1857 – Mountain Meadows massacre: Mormon settlers slaughter most members of peaceful, emigrant wagon train.
1860 – Unification of Italy: Giuseppe Garibaldi enters Naples.
1863 – American Civil War: Union troops under Quincy A. Gillmore capture Fort Wagner in Morris Island after a seven-week siege.
1864 – American Civil War: Atlanta is evacuated on orders of Union General William Tecumseh Sherman.
1876 – In Northfield, Minnesota, Jesse James and the James–Younger Gang attempt to rob the town's bank but are driven off by armed citizens.

1901–present
1901 – The Boxer Rebellion in Qing dynasty (modern-day China) officially ends with the signing of the Boxer Protocol.
1906 – Alberto Santos-Dumont flies his 14-bis aircraft at Bagatelle, France successfully for the first time.
1907 – Cunard Line's  sets sail on her maiden voyage from Liverpool, England, to New York City.
1909 – Eugène Lefebvre crashes a new French-built Wright biplane during a test flight at Juvisy, south of Paris, becoming the first aviator in the world to lose his life in a powered heavier-than-air craft.
1911 – French poet Guillaume Apollinaire is arrested and put in jail on suspicion of stealing the Mona Lisa from the Louvre museum.
1916 – US federal employees win the right to Workers' compensation by Federal Employers Liability Act (39 Stat. 742; 5 U.S.C. 751)
1920 – Two newly purchased Savoia flying boats crash in the Swiss Alps en route to Finland where they were to serve with the Finnish Air Force, killing both crews.
1921 – In Atlantic City, New Jersey, the first Miss America Pageant, a two-day event, is held.
  1921   – The Legion of Mary, the largest apostolic organization of lay people in the Catholic Church, is founded in Dublin, Ireland.
1923 – The International Criminal Police Organization (INTERPOL) is formed.
1927 – The first fully electronic television system is achieved by Philo Farnsworth.
1929 – Steamer  capsizes and sinks on Lake Näsijärvi near Tampere in Finland. One hundred thirty-six lives are lost.
1932 – The Battle of Boquerón, the first major battle of the Chaco War, commences.
1936 – The last thylacine, a carnivorous marsupial named Benjamin, dies alone in its cage at the Hobart Zoo in Tasmania.
1940 – Romania returns Southern Dobruja to Bulgaria under the Treaty of Craiova.
  1940   – World War II: The German Luftwaffe begins the Blitz, bombing London and other British cities for over 50 consecutive nights.
1942 – World War II: Japanese marines are forced to withdraw during the Battle of Milne Bay.
1943 – A fire at the Gulf Hotel in Houston kills 55 people.
  1943   – World War II: The German 17th Army begins its evacuation of the Kuban bridgehead (Taman Peninsula) in southern Russia and moves across the Strait of Kerch to the Crimea.
1945 – World War II: Japanese forces on Wake Island, which they had held since December 1941, surrender to U.S. Marines.
  1945   – The Berlin Victory Parade of 1945 is held.
1953 – Nikita Khrushchev is elected first secretary of the Communist Party of the Soviet Union.
1963 – The Pro Football Hall of Fame opens in Canton, Ohio with 17 charter members.
1965 – During an Indo-Pakistani War, China announces that it will reinforce its troops on the Indian border.
  1965   – Vietnam War: In a follow-up to August's Operation Starlite, United States Marines and South Vietnamese forces initiate Operation Piranha on the Batangan Peninsula.
1970 – Fighting begins between Arab guerrillas and government forces in Jordan.
  1970   – Vietnam Television was established.
1977 – The Torrijos–Carter Treaties between Panama and the United States on the status of the Panama Canal are signed. The United States agrees to transfer control of the canal to Panama at the end of the 20th century.
  1977   – The 300-metre-tall CKVR-DT transmission tower in Barrie, Ontario, Canada, is hit by a light aircraft in a fog, causing it to collapse. All aboard the aircraft are killed.
1978 – While walking across Waterloo Bridge in London, Bulgarian dissident Georgi Markov is assassinated by Bulgarian secret police agent Francesco Gullino by means of a ricin pellet fired from a specially-designed umbrella.
1979 – The Chrysler Corporation asks the United States government for US$1.5 billion to avoid bankruptcy.
1984 – An explosion on board a Maltese patrol boat disposing of illegal fireworks at sea off Gozo kills seven soldiers and policemen.
1986 – Desmond Tutu becomes the first black man to lead the Anglican Diocese of Cape Town.
  1986   – Chilean dictator Augusto Pinochet survives an assassination attempt by the FPMR; 5 of Pinochet's bodyguards are killed.

1997 – Maiden flight of the Lockheed Martin F-22 Raptor.
1999 – The 6.0  Athens earthquake affected the area with a maximum Mercalli intensity of IX (Violent), killing 143, injuring 800–1,600, and leaving 50,000 homeless.
2005 – Egypt holds its first-ever multi-party presidential election.
2008 – The United States government takes control of the two largest mortgage financing companies in the US, Fannie Mae and Freddie Mac.
2010 – A Chinese fishing trawler collides with two Japanese Coast Guard patrol boats in disputed waters near the Senkaku Islands.
2011 – The Lokomotiv Yaroslavl plane crash in Russia kills 43 people, including nearly the entire roster of the Lokomotiv Yaroslavl Kontinental Hockey League team.
2012 – Canada officially cuts diplomatic ties with Iran by closing its embassy in Tehran and orders the expulsion of Iranian diplomats from Ottawa, over nuclear plans and purported human rights abuses.
2017 – The 8.2  2017 Chiapas earthquake strikes southern Mexico, killing at least 60 people.
2019 – Ukrainian filmmaker Oleg Sentsov and 66 others are released in a prisoner exchange between Ukraine and Russia.
2021 – Bitcoin becomes legal tender in El Salvador.
 2021    – The National Unity Government of Myanmar declares a people's defensive war against the military junta during the Myanmar civil war

Births

Pre-1600
 923 – Suzaku, emperor of Japan (d. 952)
1395 – Reginald West, 6th Baron De La Warr, English politician (d. 1427)
1438 – Louis II, Landgrave of Lower Hesse (d. 1471)
1448 – Henry, Count of Württemberg-Montbéliard (1473–1482) (d. 1519)
1500 – Sebastian Newdigate, Carthusian monk and martyr (d. 1535)
1524 – Thomas Erastus, Swiss physician and theologian (d. 1583)
1533 – Elizabeth I of England (d. 1603)

1601–1900
1629 – Sir John Perceval, 1st Baronet, Irish nobleman (d. 1665)
1635 – Paul I, Prince Esterházy, Hungarian prince (d. 1713)
1641 – Tokugawa Ietsuna, Japanese shōgun (d. 1680)
1650 – Juan Manuel María de la Aurora, 8th duke of Escalona (d. 1725)
1683 – Maria Anna of Austria (d. 1754)
1694 – Johan Ludvig Holstein-Ledreborg, Danish Minister of State (d. 1763)
1705 – Matthäus Günther, German painter (d. 1788)
1707 – Georges-Louis Leclerc, Comte de Buffon, French mathematician, cosmologist, and author (d. 1788)
1726 – François-André Danican Philidor, French chess player and composer (d. 1795)
1740 – Johan Tobias Sergel, Swedish sculptor and illustrator (d. 1814)
1777 – Heinrich Stölzel, German horn player and composer (d. 1844)
1791 – Giuseppe Gioachino Belli, Italian poet and author (d. 1863)
1795 – John William Polidori, English physician and author (d. 1821)
1801 – Sarel Cilliers, South African preacher and activist (d.1871)
1803 – William Knibb, English Baptist minister and Jamaican missionary (d.1845)
1807 – Henry Sewell, English lawyer and politician, 1st Prime Minister of New Zealand (d. 1879)
1810 – Hermann Heinrich Gossen, Prussian economist and academic (d. 1858)
1813 – Emil Korytko, Polish activist and translator (d. 1839)
1815 – John McDouall Stuart, Scottish explorer and surveyor (d. 1866)
1818 – Thomas Talbot, American businessman and politician, 31st Governor of Massachusetts (d. 1886)
1819 – Thomas A. Hendricks, American lawyer and politician, 21st Vice President of the United States (d. 1885)
1829 – August Kekulé, German chemist and academic (d. 1896)
1831 – Alexandre Falguière, French sculptor and painter (d. 1900)
1836 – Henry Campbell-Bannerman, Scottish merchant and politician, Prime Minister of the United Kingdom (d. 1908)
  1836   – August Toepler, German physicist and academic (d. 1912)
1842 – Johannes Zukertort, Polish-English chess player, linguist, and journalist (d. 1888)
1851 – Edward Asahel Birge, American zoologist and academic (d. 1950)
1855 – William Friese-Greene, English photographer, director, and cinematographer (d. 1921)
1860 – Grandma Moses, American painter (d. 1961)
1862 – Edgar Speyer, American-English financier and philanthropist (d. 1932)
1866 – Tristan Bernard, French author and playwright (d. 1947)
1867 – Albert Bassermann, German-Swiss actor (d. 1952)
  1867   – J. P. Morgan Jr., American banker and philanthropist (d. 1943)
1869 – Ben Viljoen, South African general (d. 1917)
1870 – Aleksandr Kuprin, Russian pilot, explorer, and author (d. 1938)
1871 – George Hirst, English cricketer and coach (d. 1954)
1875 – Edward Francis Hutton, American businessman and financier, co-founded E. F. Hutton & Co. (d. 1962)
1876 – Francesco Buhagiar, Maltese politician, 2nd Prime Minister of Malta (d. 1934)
  1876   – C. J. Dennis, Australian poet and author (d. 1938)
1883 – Theophrastos Sakellaridis, Greek composer and conductor (d. 1950)
1885 – Elinor Wylie, American author and poet (d. 1928)
1887 – Edith Sitwell, English poet and critic (d. 1964)
1892 – Eric Harrison, Australian soldier and politician, 27th Australian Minister for Defence (d. 1974)
  1892   – Oscar O'Brien, Canadian priest, pianist, and composer (d. 1958)
1893 – Leslie Hore-Belisha, English politician, Secretary of State for War (d. 1957)
1894 – Vic Richardson, Australian cricketer, footballer, and sportscaster (d. 1969)
  1894   – George Waggner, American actor, director, and producer (d. 1984)
1895 – Jacques Vaché, French author and poet (d. 1919)
1900 – Taylor Caldwell, English-American author (d. 1985)
  1900   – Giuseppe Zangara, Italian-American assassin of Anton Cermak (d. 1933)

1901–present
1903 – Margaret Landon, American missionary and author (d. 1993)
  1903   – Dorothy Marie Donnelly, American poet and author (d. 1994)
1904 – C. B. Colby, American author (d. 1977)
1907 – Ahmed Adnan Saygun, Turkish composer and musicologist (d. 1991)
1908 – Paul Brown, American football player and coach (d. 1991)
  1908   – Michael E. DeBakey, American surgeon and educator (d. 2008)
  1908   – Max Kaminsky, American trumpet player and bandleader (d. 1994)
1909 – Elia Kazan, Greek-American actor, director, producer, and screenwriter (d. 2003)
1911 – Todor Zhivkov, Bulgarian police officer and politician, Head of State of Bulgaria (d. 1998)
1912 – David Packard, American engineer and businessman, co-founded Hewlett-Packard (d. 1996)
1913 – Martin Charteris, Baron Charteris of Amisfield, English soldier and courtier (d. 1999)
  1913   – Anthony Quayle, English actor (d. 1989)
1914 – Lída Baarová, Czech-Austrian actress (d. 2000)
  1914   – Graeme Bell, Australian pianist and composer (d. 2012)
  1914   – James Van Allen, American physicist and philosopher (d. 2006)
1915 – Pedro Reginaldo Lira, Argentinian bishop (d. 2012)
  1915   – Kiyosi Itô, Japanese mathematician and academic (d. 2008)
1917 – Leonard Cheshire, English captain, pilot, and humanitarian (d. 1992)
  1917   – John Cornforth, Australian-English chemist and academic, Nobel Prize laureate (d. 2013)
  1917   – Jacob Lawrence, American painter and educator (d. 2000)
1918 – Harold Amos, American microbiologist and academic (d. 2003)
1919 – Briek Schotte, Belgian cyclist and coach (d. 2004)
1920 – Harri Webb, Welsh journalist and poet (d. 1994)
1921 – Peter A. Peyser, American soldier and politician (d. 2014)
1922 – Lucien Jarraud, French-Canadian journalist and radio host (d. 2007)
1923 – Nancy Keesing, Australian author and poet (d. 1993)
  1923   – Peter Lawford, English-American actor (d. 1984)
  1923   – Louise Suggs, American golfer, co-founded LPGA (d. 2015)
1924 – Daniel Inouye, American captain and politician, Medal of Honor recipient (d. 2012)
  1924   – Leonard Rosenman, American composer and conductor (d. 2008)
1925 – Laura Ashley, Welsh-English fashion designer, founded Laura Ashley plc (d. 1985)
  1925   – Allan Blakeney, Canadian lawyer and politician, 10th Premier of Saskatchewan (d. 2011)
  1925   – Bhanumathi Ramakrishna, Indian actress, singer, director, and producer (d. 2005)
1926 – Samuel Goldwyn Jr., American director and producer (d. 2015)
  1926   – Donald J. Irwin, American lawyer and politician, 32nd Mayor of Norwalk (d. 2013)
  1926   – Patrick Jenkin, Baron Jenkin of Roding, English lawyer and politician, Secretary of State for the Environment (d. 2016)
  1926   – Erich Juskowiak, German footballer (d. 1983)
  1926   – Don Messick, American voice actor (d. 1997)
1927 – Eric Hill, English-American author and illustrator (d. 2014)
  1927   – Claire L'Heureux-Dubé, Canadian lawyer and jurist
1928 – Kathleen Gorham, Australian ballerina (d. 1983)
  1928   – Al McGuire, American basketball player, coach, and commentator (d. 2001)
1929 – Clyde Lovellette, American basketball player (d. 2016)
1930 – Baudouin of Belgium (d. 1993)
  1930   – Sonny Rollins, American saxophonist and composer
  1930   – S. Sivanayagam, Sri Lankan journalist and author (d. 2010)
1931 – Charles Camilleri, Maltese composer and conductor (d. 2009)
1932 – Malcolm Bradbury, English author and academic (d. 2000)
  1932   – John Paul Getty Jr., American-English philanthropist and book collector (d. 2003)
1934 – Mary Bauermeister, German painter and illustrator (d. 2023)
  1934   – Waldo de los Ríos, Argentinian composer and conductor (d. 1977)
  1934   – Sunil Gangopadhyay, Indian author and poet (d. 2012)
  1934   – Omar Karami, Lebanese lawyer and politician, 58th Prime Minister of Lebanon (d. 2015)
  1934   – Little Milton, American singer and guitarist (d. 2005)
1935 – Abdou Diouf, Senegalese lawyer and politician, 2nd President of Senegal
  1935   – Dick O'Neal, American basketball player and dentist (d. 2013)
1936 – Brian Hart, English race car driver and engineer, founded Brian Hart Ltd. (d. 2014)
  1936   – Buddy Holly, American singer-songwriter and guitarist (d. 1959)
  1936   – Apostolos Kaklamanis, Greek lawyer and politician, Greek Minister of Justice
1937 – John Phillip Law, American actor (d. 2008)
  1937   – Oleg Lobov, Russian politician, Premier of the Russian SFSR (d. 2018)
1939 – Latimore, American singer-songwriter and pianist
  1939   – Peter Gill, Welsh actor, director, and playwright
1940 – Dario Argento, Italian director, producer, and screenwriter
  1940   – Abdurrahman Wahid, Indonesian journalist and politician, 4th President of Indonesia (d. 2009)
1942 – Billy Best, Scottish footballer
  1942   – Alan Oakes, English footballer and manager
  1942   – Andrew Stone, Baron Stone of Blackheath, English businessman and politician
  1942   – Jonathan H. Turner, American sociologist
1943 – Beverley McLachlin, Canadian lawyer and jurist, 17th Chief Justice of Canada
1944 – Forrest Blue, American football player (d. 2011)
  1944   – Bertel Haarder, Danish lawyer and politician, Education Minister of Denmark
  1944   – Peter Larter, English rugby player
  1944   – Earl Manigault, American basketball player and coach (d. 1998)
  1944   – Bora Milutinović, Serbian footballer and manager
1944 – Houshang Moradi Kermani, Iranian author
1945 – Jacques Lemaire, Canadian ice hockey player and coach
  1945   – Vic Pollard, English-New Zealand rugby player and footballer
  1945   – Curtis Price, American musicologist and academic
  1945   – Peter Storey, English footballer
1946 – Willie Crawford, American baseball player (d. 2004)
  1946   – Joe Klein, American journalist and author
  1946   – Suzyn Waldman, American sportscaster
1947 – Sergio Della Pergola, Israeli demographer and statistician
  1947   – Gloria Gaynor, American singer-songwriter
1948 – Susan Blakely, American actress
1949 – Dianne Hayter, German-English politician
  1949   – Barry Siegel, American journalist and academic
1950 – David Cannadine, English historian and author
  1950   – Johann Friedrich, German-Australian engineer (d. 1991)
  1950   – Julie Kavner, American actress 
  1950   – Peggy Noonan, American author, journalist, speechwriter, and pundit
1951 – Chrissie Hynde, American singer-songwriter and guitarist 
  1951   – Morris Albert, Brazilian singer-songwriter
  1951   – Mark Isham, American trumpet player and composer
  1951   – Mark McCumber, American golfer
  1951   – Mammootty, Indian actor and producer
1952 – Ricardo Tormo, Spanish motorcycle racer (d. 1998)
  1953   – Marc Hunter, New Zealand-Australian singer-songwriter (d. 1998)
  1953   – Benmont Tench, American keyboardist and songwriter
1954 – Corbin Bernsen, American actor
  1954   – Michael Emerson, American actor
  1954   – Kerrie Holley, American software architect and academic 
1955 – Mira Furlan, Croatian-American actress (d. 2021)  
1956 – Michael Feinstein, American singer and pianist
  1956   – Byron Stevenson, Welsh footballer (d. 2007)
  1956   – Diane Warren, American songwriter
1957 – Jermaine Stewart, American singer-songwriter and dancer (d. 1997)
1960 – Brad Houser, American bass player 
1961 – LeRoi Moore, American saxophonist and songwriter  (d. 2008)
  1961   – Jean-Yves Thibaudet, French pianist
1962 – Jennifer Egan, American novelist and short story writer
  1962   – George South, American wrestler
  1962   – Hasan Vezir, Turkish footballer and manager
1964 – Eazy-E, American rapper and producer (d. 1995)
1965 – Angela Gheorghiu, Romanian soprano
  1965   – Darko Pančev, Macedonian footballer
  1965   – Uta Pippig, German runner
  1965   – Tomáš Skuhravý, Czech footballer
  1965   – Andreas Thom, German footballer and manager
1966 – Vladimir Andreyev, Russian race walker
  1966   – Lutz Heilmann, German politician
  1966   – Toby Jones, English actor
  1966   – Gunda Niemann-Stirnemann, German speed skater
  1966   – Andrew Voss, Australian sportscaster and author
1967 – Alok Sharma, Indian-English accountant and politician
1968 – Marcel Desailly, Ghanaian-French footballer
  1968   – Gennadi Krasnitski, Russian figure skater and coach
1969 – Darren Bragg, American baseball player and coach
  1969   – Rudy Galindo, American figure skater
1970 – Gino Odjick, Canadian ice hockey player
  1970   – Tom Everett Scott, American actor
1971 – Gene Pritsker, American composer
  1971   – Shane Mosley, American boxer and trainer
1972 – Jason Isringhausen, American baseball player and coach
1973 – Shannon Elizabeth, American model and actress
  1973   – Alex Kurtzman, American director, producer, and screenwriter
1974 – Mario Frick, Swiss-Liechtensteiner footballer
  1974   – Antonio McDyess, American basketball player
1975 – Norifumi Abe, Japanese motorcycle racer (d. 2007)
  1975   – Harold Wallace, Costa Rican footballer and manager
1976 – Wavell Hinds, Jamaican cricketer
1977 – Molly Holly, American wrestler and trainer
  1977   – Jon Macken, English-Irish footballer
1978 – Matt Cooke, Canadian ice hockey player
  1978   – Erwin Koen, Dutch footballer
  1978   – Ersin Güreler, Turkish footballer
1979 – Nathan Hindmarsh, Australian rugby league player and sportscaster
  1979   – Paul Mara, American ice hockey player
  1979   – Owen Pallett, Canadian singer-songwriter and keyboard player 
  1979   – Brian Stokes, American baseball player
1980 – Emre Belözoğlu, Turkish footballer
  1980   – Sara Carrigan, Australian cyclist
  1980   – Gabriel Milito, Argentinian footballer
  1980   – Javad Nekounam, Iranian footballer
  1980   – Mark Prior, American baseball player
1981 – Gökhan Zan, Turkish footballer
  1981   – Vangelis, Mexican wrestler
1982 – Andre Dirrell, American boxer
  1982   – George Bailey, Australian cricketer
  1982   – Emese Szász, Hungarian fencer
1983 – Philip Deignan, Irish cyclist
  1983   – Annette Dytrt, German figure skater
  1983   – Pops Mensah-Bonsu, English-American basketball player
  1983   – Piri Weepu, New Zealand rugby player
1984 – Ben Hollingsworth, Canadian actor
  1984   – Farveez Maharoof, Sri Lankan cricketer
  1984   – Miranda, Brazilian footballer
  1984   – Vera Zvonareva, Russian tennis player
  1984   – Pelin Karahan, Turkish actress
1985 – Radhika Apte, Indian actress
  1985   – Wade Davis, American baseball player
  1985   – Adam Eckersley, English footballer
  1985   – Rafinha, Brazilian footballer
1986 – Charlie Daniels, English footballer
  1986   – Colin Delaney, American wrestler
1987 – Tommy Elphick, English footballer
  1987   – Sammy Moore, English footballer
  1987   – Danny North, English footballer
  1987   – Evan Rachel Wood, American actress and singer
  1987   – Aleksandra Wozniak, Canadian tennis player
1988 – Alex Harvey, Canadian skier
  1988   – Kevin Love, American basketball player
1990 – Libor Hudáček, Slovakian ice hockey player
  1990   – Fedor Klimov, Russian figure skater
1991 – Dale Finucane, Australian rugby league player
  1991   – Amar Garibović, Serbian skier (d. 2010)
1994 – Elinor Barker, Welsh track cyclist
  1994   – Herman Ese'ese, New Zealand rugby league player
  1994   – Tom Opacic, Australian rugby league player
  1994   – Kento Yamazaki, Japanese actor
1996 – Donovan Mitchell, American basketball player
1999 – Laurie Jussaume, Canadian cyclist

Deaths

Pre-1600
 251 – Sima Yi, Chinese general and politician (b. 179)
 355 – Claudius Silvanus, Roman general
 859 – Emperor Xuānzong of Tang, Chinese emperor (b. 810)
 934 – Meng Zhixiang, Chinese general (b. 874)
1134 – Alfonso the Battler, Spanish emperor (b. 1073)
1151 – Geoffrey Plantagenet, Count of Anjou (b. 1113)
1202 – William of the White Hands, French cardinal (b. 1135)
1251 – Viola, Duchess of Opole
1303 – Gregory Bicskei, archbishop of Esztergom
1312 – Ferdinand IV of Castile (b. 1285)
1354 – Andrea Dandolo, doge of Venice (b. 1306)
1362 – Joan of the Tower (b. 1321)
1464 – Frederick II, Elector of Saxony (b. 1412)
1496 – Ferdinand II of Naples (b. 1469)
1559 – Robert Estienne, English-French printer and scholar (b. 1503)
1566 – Nikola Šubić Zrinski, Croatian general (b. 1506)
1573 – Joanna of Austria, Princess of Portugal (b. 1535)

1601–1900
1601 – John Shakespeare, father of William Shakespeare (b. 1529)
1619 – Melchior Grodziecki, Polish priest and saint (b. 1582)
  1619   – Marko Krizin, Croatian priest, missionary, and saint (b. 1589)
1622 – Denis Godefroy, French lawyer and jurist (b. 1549)
1626 – Edward Villiers, English noble and politician (b. c. 1585)
1644 – Guido Bentivoglio, Italian cardinal and historian (b. 1579)
1655 – François Tristan l'Hermite, French author and playwright (b. 1601)
1657 – Arvid Wittenberg, Swedish field marshal (b. 1606)
1685 – William Carpenter, English-American settler, co-founded Rhode Island and Providence Plantations (b. 1605)
1729 – William Burnet, Dutch-American civil servant and politician, 21st Governor of the Province of New York (b. 1688)
1741 – Blas de Lezo, Spanish admiral (b. 1689)
1798 – Peter Frederik Suhm, Danish-Norwegian historian and author (b. 1728)
1799 – Louis-Guillaume Le Monnier, French botanist and physicist (b. 1717)
1809 – Buddha Yodfa Chulaloke, Thai king (b. 1737)
1833 – Hannah More, English poet, playwright, and philanthropist (b. 1745)
1840 – Jacques MacDonald, French general (b. 1765)
1871 – Kimenzan Tanigorō, Japanese sumo wrestler, the 13th Yokozuna (b. 1826)
  1871   – Mehmed Emin Âli Pasha, Ottoman politician, 217th Grand Vizier of the Ottoman Empire (b. 1815)
1881 – Sidney Lanier, American poet and academic (b. 1842)
1891 – Lorenzo Sawyer, American lawyer and judge (b. 1820)
1892 – John Greenleaf Whittier, American poet and activist (b. 1807)
1893 – Hamilton Fish, American lawyer and politician, 26th United States Secretary of State (b. 1808)

1901–present
1907 – Bogdan Petriceicu Hasdeu, Romanian philologist, journalist, and playwright (b. 1838)
1910 – William Holman Hunt, English painter and soldier (b. 1827)
1920 – Simon-Napoléon Parent, Canadian lawyer and politician, 12th Premier of Quebec (b. 1855)
1921 – Alfred William Rich, English author and painter (b. 1856)
1929 – Frederic Weatherly, English lawyer, author, and songwriter (b. 1848)
1933 – Edward Grey, 1st Viscount Grey of Fallodon, English ornithologist and politician, Secretary of State for Foreign and Commonwealth Affairs (b. 1862)
1939 – Kyōka Izumi, Japanese author, poet, and playwright (b. 1873)
1940 – José Félix Estigarribia, Paraguayan soldier and politician, President of Paraguay (b. 1888)
1941 – Mario García Menocal, Cuban lawyer and politician, President of Cuba (b. 1866)
1942 – Cecilia Beaux, American painter and academic (b. 1855)
1949 – José Clemente Orozco, Mexican painter and illustrator (b. 1883)
1951 – Maria Montez, Dominican-French actress (b. 1912)
  1951   – John French Sloan, American painter and etcher (b. 1871)
1954 – Bud Fisher, American cartoonist (b. 1885)
1956 – C. B. Fry, English cricketer, academic, and politician (b. 1872)
1959 – Maurice Duplessis, Canadian lawyer and politician, 16th Premier of Quebec (b. 1890)
1960 – Wilhelm Pieck, German carpenter and politician, President of East Germany (b. 1873)
1961 – Pieter Sjoerds Gerbrandy, Dutch lawyer, jurist, and politician, 34th Prime Minister of the Netherlands (b. 1885)
1962 – Karen Blixen, Danish memoirist and short story writer (b. 1885)
  1962   – Graham Walker, English motorcycle racer and journalist (b. 1897)
1964 – Walter A. Brown, American businessman (b. 1905)
1969 – Everett Dirksen, American lieutenant and politician (b. 1896)
1970 – Yitzhak Gruenbaum, Polish-Israeli journalist and politician, 1st Internal Affairs Minister of Israel (b. 1879)
1971 – Spring Byington, American actress (b. 1886)
  1971   – Ludwig Suthaus, German tenor (b. 1906)
1972 – Dimitris Poulianos, Greek painter and illustrator (b. 1899)
1973 – Holling C. Holling, American author and illustrator (b. 1900)
  1973   – Lev Vladimirsky, Kazakhstani-Russian admiral (b. 1903)
1974 – S. M. Rasamanickam, Ceylon politician (b. 1913)
1978 – Cecil Aronowitz, South African-English viola player (b. 1916)
  1978   – Keith Moon, English drummer (The Who) (b. 1946)
  1978   – Charles Williams, English composer and conductor (b. 1893)
1979 – I. A. Richards, English literary critic and rhetorician (b. 1893)
1981 – Christy Brown, Irish author, poet, and painter (b. 1932)
1982 – Ken Boyer, American baseball player, coach, and manager (b. 1931)
1984 – Joe Cronin, American baseball player and manager (b. 1906)
  1984   – Josyf Slipyj, Ukrainian cardinal (b. 1892)
  1984   – Don Tallon, Australian cricketer (b. 1916)
  1985   – Jacoba van Velde, Dutch author (b. 1903)
1985 – José Zabala-Santos, Filipino cartoonist (b. 1911)
1986 – Les Bury, English-Australian public servant and politician, 26th Australian Minister for Foreign Affairs (b. 1913)
1988 – Sedad Hakkı Eldem, Turkish architect (b. 1908)
1989 – Mikhail Goldstein, Ukrainian violinist and composer (b. 1917)
1990 – Earle E. Partridge, American general and pilot (b. 1900)
  1990   – A. J. P. Taylor, English historian and journalist (b. 1906)
1991 – Edwin McMillan, American physicist and chemist, Nobel Prize laureate (b. 1907)
1994 – Eric Crozier, English director and playwright (b. 1914)
  1994   – Dennis Morgan, American actor (b. 1908)
  1994   – Terence Young, Chinese-English director and screenwriter (b. 1915)
1995 – Russell Johnson, American cartoonist (b. 1893)
1996 – Bibi Besch, Austrian-American actress (b. 1942)
1997 – Mobutu Sese Seko, Congolese soldier and politician, President of Zaire (b. 1930)
2000 – Bruce Gyngell, Australian-English broadcaster (b. 1929)
2001 – Igor Buketoff, American conductor and educator (b. 1915)
  2001   – Spede Pasanen, Finnish film director and producer, comedian, and inventor (b. 1930)
  2001   – Billie Lou Watt, American actress and voice artist (b. 1924)
2002 – Uziel Gal, German-Israeli colonel and gun designer, designed the Uzi (b. 1923)
2003 – Warren Zevon, American singer-songwriter (b. 1947)
2004 – Bob Boyd, American baseball player (b. 1925)
2008 – Kune Biezeveld, Dutch minister and theologian (b. 1948)
  2008   – Ilarion Ciobanu, Romanian rugby player and actor (b. 1931)
  2008   – Don Haskins, American basketball player and coach (b. 1930)
  2008   – Gregory Mcdonald, American author (b. 1937)
  2008   – Nagi Noda, Japanese director and producer (b. 1973)
2010 – Amar Garibović, Serbian skier (b. 1991)
  2010   – William H. Goetzmann, American historian and author (b. 1930)
  2010   – Barbara Holland, American author (b. 1933)
  2010   – John Kluge, German-American businessman (b.  1914)
  2010   – Glenn Shadix, American actor (b. 1952)
2011 – Victims of the 2011 Lokomotiv Yaroslavl plane crash
                Pavol Demitra, Slovakian ice hockey player (b. 1974)
                Alexander Karpovtsev, Russian ice hockey player and coach (b. 1970)
                Igor Korolev, Russian ice hockey player and coach (b. 1970)
                Stefan Liv, Polish-Swedish ice hockey player (b. 1980)
                Jan Marek, Czech ice hockey player (b. 1979)
                Brad McCrimmon, Canadian ice hockey player and coach (b. 1959)
                Karel Rachůnek, Czech ice hockey player (b. 1979)
                Kārlis Skrastiņš, Latvian ice hockey player (b. 1974)
                Ruslan Salei, Belarusian ice hockey player (b. 1974)
                Josef Vašíček, Czech ice hockey player (b. 1980)
2012 – César Fernández Ardavín, Spanish director and screenwriter (b. 1923)
  2012   – Aleksandr Maksimenkov, Russian footballer and manager (b. 1952)
  2012   – Daniel Weinreb, American computer scientist and programmer (b. 1959)
2013 – Albert Allen Bartlett, American physicist and academic (b. 1923)
  2013   – Romesh Bhandari, Pakistani-Indian politician and diplomat, 13th Foreign Secretary of India (b. 1928)
  2013   – Frank Blevins, English-Australian politician, 7th Deputy Premier of South Australia (b. 1939)
  2013   – Pete Hoffman, American cartoonist (b. 1919)
  2013   – Ilja Hurník, Czech playwright and composer (b. 1922)
  2013   – Fred Katz, American cellist and composer (b. 1919)
2014 – Kwon Ri-se, South Korean singer (b. 1991)
  2014   – Jack Cristil, American sportscaster and radio host (b. 1925)
  2014   – Raul M. Gonzalez, Filipino lawyer and politician, 42nd Filipino Secretary of Justice (b. 1930)
  2014   – Yoshiko Ōtaka, Chinese-Japanese actress, singer, and politician (b. 1920)
  2014   – Harold Shipp, Canadian businessman and philanthropist (b. 1926)
2015 – Dickie Moore, American actor (b. 1925)
  2015   – Candida Royalle, American porn actress, director, and producer (b. 1950)
  2015   – Guillermo Rubalcaba, Cuban pianist, composer, and bandleader (b. 1927)
  2015   – Voula Zouboulaki, Greek actress (b. 1924)
2018 – Pedro Jirón, Nicaraguan footballer

Holidays and observances
 Air Force Day (Pakistan) 
 Christian feast day:
 Anastasius the Fuller
 Clodoald
 Gratus of Aosta
 Stephen Pongracz
 Marko Krizin
 Regina
 September 7 (Eastern Orthodox liturgics)
 Constitution Day (Fiji) 
 Independence Day (Brazil), celebrates the independence of Brazil from Portugal in 1822.
 Military Intelligence Day (Ukraine)
 National Threatened Species Day (Australia)
 Victory Day (Mozambique)

References

External links

 
 
 

Days of the year
September